Shelley Godfrey may refer to:

 Shelley Godfrey, a character in the television series Hemlock Grove (TV series)
Shelly Godfrey see Number Six (Battlestar Galactica)